Aleksandr Nikolayevich Kartsev (Russian: Александр Николаевич Карцев; born 31 December 2001) is a Russian artistic gymnast. He competed as an individual representing the Russian Olympic Committee at the 2020 Summer Olympics.

Career
As a junior, Kartsev competed at the 2017 European Youth Olympic Festival where he was part of the Russian team alongside Yuri Busse and Sergei Naidin that won the team gold medal ahead of Great Britain and Switzerland. He also won two individual medals: a gold on the horizontal bar and a silver on the parallel bars.

In 2019, Kartsev competed at the Osijek World Cup, taking the silver medal in the horizontal bar final, as well as the bronze in the parallel bars final. He placed seventh in the parallel bars final at the 2019 Paris World Challenge Cup.

Kartsev represented Russia at the 2021 European Artistic Gymnastics Championships in Basel, Switzerland. He placed third in the all-around during qualifications but did not reach the final due to the two-per-country rule, as his teammates Nikita Nagornyy and David Belyavskiy finished ahead of him.

Kartsev is a two-time (2020 and 2021) Russian national all-around champion.

In June 2021, Kartsev was named to the Russian men's gymnastics team for the Tokyo Olympics alongside Nikita Nagornyy, David Belyavskiy and Artur Dalaloyan. However, it was later announced that Kartsev would compete at the Games as an individual, and Denis Ablyazin would take his place on the team. Kartsev placed 29th in the all-around during qualifications and did not advance to the final.

Competitive history

References

External links

2001 births
Living people
Russian male artistic gymnasts
People from Vladimir, Russia
Gymnasts at the 2020 Summer Olympics
Olympic gymnasts of Russia
Sportspeople from Vladimir Oblast
21st-century Russian people